Jana Gana Mana is a 2022 Indian Malayalam-language legal thriller film directed by Dijo Jose Antony and starring Prithviraj Sukumaran, Suraj Venjaramoodu, Pasupathi Raj, G. M. Sundar, Mamta Mohandas, Sri Divya. The film was released on 28 April 2022 which received positive reviews for narrative style, cast performances and technical aspects.

Plot
The possible murder of Prof. Saba Mariyam, a strong and socially-responsible college professor, from the Central University in Ramanagaram, leads to protests organized by the college students led by Gouri Lakshmi, who wants to seek justice for Saba's death. They get brutally suppressed by the state police. This incident evokes strong protests and demonstrations against police brutality across the country. Under pressure, the Karnataka government appoints ACP Sajjan Kumar to solve Saba Mariyam's murder case.

When Sajjan starts investigating the case, He finds that four people had burnt her to death and arrests them, but before he could present them before the court, he gets taken off the case. This is because of certain wheels that have been turned in the top police tiers, as a consequence of the political connections of the accused. Out of desperation that they might escape judicial punishment, Sajjan takes them to a location under the guise of recreating the crime for evidence and shoots them to death. The encounter leads to Sajjan becoming a hero in the eyes of the public. However, a few Human rights activists files a complaint against the encounter, which leads to a court case.

The defence is represented by Adv. Aravind Swaminathan, who reveals to the court and the entire country that this entire case was a huge plot by the Karnataka government to retain their position in the coming elections and the mastermind behind the plan was Sajjan. In reality, Saba was killed by a fellow colleague Vidyasagar, against whom she had filed charges for treating Vidya, a student badly because of her caste and her subsequent suicide, by running his car over her and that this mere hit and run case had become the national headline the very next day. When this news reached the Home Minister Nageshwara Rao, he got advised by Sajjan to use this as an opportunity to gain popular support in the coming elections as the IB reports states that Nageshwara Rao's party will lose power.

Sajjan gets arrested but, again in another turn of events, it is revealed that it was Sajjan himself who gave all the details of his wrongdoings to Aravind through his fellow police officer Murthy, out of guilt. This was his chance at redemption. Sajjan is now in prison where Murthy meets him and reveals about Vidyasagar's arrest and Aravind's past. Aravind was a former DCP who went against Nageshwara Rao and suffered personal losses of losing his wife Padma and was sent to prison on false charges. After learning about Saba's case from Murthy, Aravind used this case to destroy Nageshwara Rao's life as vengeance. Aravind gets rid of his crutches and prepares himself to kill Nageshwara Rao.

Cast

Production 
The film is produced by Supriya Menon and Listin Stephen. The film stars Prithviraj Sukumaran, Suraj Venjaramoodu, Pasupathi Raj, G. M. Sundar and Mamta Mohandas.

Music
The music of the film is composed by Jakes Bejoy.

Release

Theatrical
Jana Gana Mana  released on 28 April 2022. The film was previously scheduled to release in late 2021, but was delayed due to the COVID-19 pandemic in India. The film was released in Malayalam along with the dubbed version in Tamil, Telugu and Kannada.

Home media
The digital streaming rights of the film were bought by Netflix and streaming started from 2 June 2022.

Reception

Critical response
Jana Gana Mana received positive reviews from critics and audience alike. Deepa Soman of The Times of India gave the film 3.5 out of 5 writing "Those who love a good political crime thriller inspired from real-life incidents can feast on Jana Gana Mana, that teaches you to think, question, challenge and more as a common man who consumes news at its face value." Pinkvilla gave 3.5/5 and wrote, An engaging Social drama about social conscience and asking the right questions. The Indian Express wrote "Prithviraj steals the show in this preachy and patronising political thriller". The New Indian express wrote "Prithviraj-starrer is an epic, high-impact political thriller". Ancy K Sunny of The Week rated 3.5 out of 5 and wrote "Suraj Venjaramoodu steals the show in a thought-provoking political thriller". Sreeju Sudhakaran of LatestLY gave the film a rating of 3/5 and wrote "Prithviraj Sukumaran, Suraj Venjaramoodu's Film Makes All The Right Noises in a Wobbly, Cramped Screenplay".

The film is loosely based on several real-life incidents of extrajudicial killings in India, including the 2016 suicide of Rohith Vemula, 2018 murder of a tribal man in Kerala, the 2019 Hyderabad gang rape case and the 2019 suicide of Fathima Latheef.

Sequel
On 29 March 2022, during the press event of the film, Prithviraj revealed that the pre-production works of the sequel of the film had already begun. He also revealed that the visuals featured in the teaser and trailer of the film were from the second part of the film. The first part would primarily feature flashback sequences while the second part would feature the story taking place during the current time.

References

External links 
 

2022 films
2022 thriller films
Indian thriller films
2020s Malayalam-language films
Films scored by Jakes Bejoy